Ivica Dragutinović (Serbian Cyrillic: Ивица Драгутиновић, ; born 13 November 1975) is a Serbian former professional footballer. Mainly a central defender, he could also operate as a defensive left back.

After nearly one decade in Belgium, mainly with Standard Liége, he went to a part of the Sevilla squads that won six major titles in the 2000s.

The recipient of 49 caps, Dragutinović represented Serbia and Montenegro at the 2006 World Cup.

Club career

Early years and Belgium
Born in Prijepolje, Dragutinović started playing football with hometown team FK Polimlje. He joined Second League of FR Yugoslavia club FK Bor in the summer of 1992. After one season, Dragutinović moved to fellow Second League club FK Borac Čačak, helping them win the league and promotion to the First League of FR Yugoslavia. He made 56 appearances and scored three goals in the top flight (1994–1996), before heading to Belgium in 1996 and spending the following nine years there with K.A.A. Gent and Standard Liège, appearing in 219 First Division A games in the process.

Dragutinović was an overwhelming success after his arrival in Liège, having played over 200 official matches for the club. He still started 2005–06 with Standard but, on the last day of the August transfer window, signed with Sevilla FC on a 3+1 contract as an immediate replacement for Real Madrid-bound Sergio Ramos.

Sevilla
Dragutinović saw regular playing time during his first three seasons, appearing in the middle or the left flank of the back four and scoring once in every campaign as the team won, amongst other trophies, back-to-back UEFA Cups (he took part in a combined 18 matches in those conquests, including the 2007 final against RCD Espanyol). He already held a Belgian passport, thus not being included in the three non-EU player quota of La Liga.

On 2 August 2007, Spanish sports paper Marca claimed that Dragutinović had agreed to join Newcastle United of the Premier League. On 5 November, however, he put pen to paper on a new four-year deal. Still in that month, on the 25th, he was first to rush to the aid of collapsed teammate Antonio Puerta during the match against Getafe CF, due to a heart attack, arguably prolonging his life by keeping him from swallowing his tongue; Puerta eventually died in the hospital, three days later.

On 24 November 2009, Dragutinović scored an own goal during Sevilla's 0–1 defeat to FC Unirea Urziceni for the season's UEFA Champions League. It was his second at Stadionul Steaua, as he had already had the dubious honour in a match against ground owners FC Steaua București, in the UEFA Cup.

Dragutinović appeared in 20 matches in the 2009–10 season, as Sevilla finished fourth. On 20 February 2010, he netted through an unstoppable curl in a 3–1 victory at RCD Mallorca, precisely the team they edged for the final Champions League berth.

Following a severe injury, Dragutinović's first appearance in 2010–11 only took place on 11 May 2011: he entered the pitch in the last ten minutes of an away fixture against CA Osasuna, with the Andalusians leading 2–0 only to lose 2–3. On 26 May 2011, the 35-year-old – often referred to as just Drago during his stint – confirmed he was leaving the Ramón Sánchez Pizjuán Stadium.

International career
Dragutinović made his debut for the Yugoslavia national team on 13 December 2000, in a friendly against Greece that ended 1–1. During the country's successful 2006 FIFA World Cup qualifying campaign he, alongside Goran Gavrančić, Nemanja Vidić and Mladen Krstajić, formed the "Famous Four" defence that only allowed one goal (from Spain's Raúl); during the final stages he only appeared in the group stage 0–1 loss to the Netherlands, as the nation conceded ten and lost all matches in Germany.

On 12 September 2007, in the dying minutes of a UEFA Euro 2008 qualifier in Portugal, Dragutinović was involved in an altercation with opposing manager Luiz Felipe Scolari, whom eventually punched the defender. They were handed four and two-match bans, respectively, as Serbia finished third in their group and failed to qualify.

Dragutinović was again called up for the 2010 World Cup qualifying campaign, playing six out of ten matches and helping the newly reformed Serbia to their first FIFA World Cup. After an achilles tendon injury sustained in training for Sevilla, however, he was ruled out of the finals in South Africa.

Career statistics

International
Source:

Honours
Sevilla
Copa del Rey: 2006–07, 2009–10
Supercopa de España: 2007
UEFA Cup: 2005–06, 2006–07
UEFA Super Cup: 2006; Runner-up 2007

References

External links

National team data 

1975 births
Living people
People from Prijepolje
Serbian footballers
Association football defenders
Serbian SuperLiga players
FK Bor players
FK Borac Čačak players
Belgian Pro League players
K.A.A. Gent players
Standard Liège players
La Liga players
Sevilla FC players
UEFA Cup winning players
Serbia and Montenegro international footballers
Serbia international footballers
2006 FIFA World Cup players
Serbian expatriate footballers
Serbia and Montenegro expatriate footballers
Serbia and Montenegro footballers
Expatriate footballers in Belgium
Expatriate footballers in Spain
Serbia and Montenegro expatriate sportspeople in Belgium
Serbia and Montenegro expatriate sportspeople in Spain
Recipients of the Order of St. Sava
Serbian expatriate sportspeople in Spain